The University of Ioannina (UoI; Greek: Πανεπιστήμιο Ιωαννίνων, Panepistimio Ioanninon) is a university located 5 km southwest of Ioannina, Greece. The university was founded in 1964, as a charter of the Aristotle University of Thessaloniki and became an independent university in 1970.

As of 2017, there is a student population of 25,000 enrolled at the university (21,900 at the undergraduate level and 3,200 at the postgraduate level) and 580 faculty members, while teaching is further supplemented by 171 Teaching Fellows and 132 Technical Laboratory staff. The university Administrative Services are staffed with 420 employees.

University of Ioannina is one of the leading academic institutions in Greece.

History 

The efforts for the establishment of a University in Ioannina and in the wider area were apparent in the last years before the revolution. At that time, prominent Epirote intellectuals had attempted to establish University Schools in the Epirus region. Since the 1950s there was a great need for the establishment of a university in the area that would validate the region's cultural significance and history. In 1962 a committee was established in Athens under the name "Central Committee for the establishment of a University in Ioannina" that fought for the particular goal. In a proclamation that they published in July 1962, they called for every citizen in the region to also fight for the cause.

The change of government, which took place in 1964, passed a new law that changed the organization and administration of the faculties of the University of Ioannina. Within the framework of the educational reform, on May 8, 1964, the establishment of a Department of Philosophy in Ioannina was announced by the daily press, as a branch of the Aristotle University of Thessaloniki. The Department was founded and started its operation in the academic year 1964-65 with two hundred students.

Campus 

The campus is located 6 km from the centre of Ioannina and is one of the largest university campuses in Greece. It is linked to the town by Greek National Road 5 and can be reached from the city either by public transportation or by car.

It covers an area of almost  with many green open spaces which surround the four main building complexes.

The buildings cover an area of 170,000 m2, consisting of lecture halls, offices, laboratories, libraries, amphitheaters, etc. Large classes are held in auditoriums, while scientific meetings and exhibitions are held in the Conference Centre located in the Medical Sciences complex.

Two buildings accommodate the Student Residence Halls, both being close to the Student Union building; a multi-purpose building that houses the student restaurant and a large Hall of Ceremonies together with "Phegos"; a restaurant where the academic community and visitors can eat or celebrate special occasions, such as the graduation day. 	

One of the most attractive places on the campus is the old Monastery of Dourouti, an 18th-century building, which is being renovated to serve as a guest house for visitors to the university.

Schools and departments 
As of 2017, the University of Ioannina consists of seven schools and fifteen departments.

Academic excellence and rankings 
The University is ranked 501st-600th in The Times Higher Education (THE) annual list.

According to the 2017 Leiden rankings the University of Ioannina is ranked #2 overall in Greece.

According to the 2014 Leiden ranking of Greek Universities, the University of Ioannina is ranked #1 in Medicine and Life Sciences, #2 in Physics, #2 in Mathematics, #2 in Computer Science, #3 in Earth Sciences and #2 overall.

According to 2010 rankings published in Springer's journal Scientometrics, the Physics department at the University of Ioannina is ranked #2 in Greece, the Material Science department #3, and the Chemistry department #4.

State academic evaluation
In 2015 the external evaluation committee gave University of Ioannina a Positive evaluation.

An external evaluation of all academic departments in Greek universities was conducted by the Hellenic Quality Assurance and Accreditation Agency (HQAA).  The following Ioannina departments have been evaluated:
 Department of Physics (2010) 
 Department of Mathematics (2011) 
 Department of Chemistry (2011) 
 Department of Computer Science and Engineering (2011) 
 Department of Materials Science and Engineering (2011) 
 Department of Biological Applications and Technologies (2011) 
 Department of Medicine (2013) 
 Department of Primary School Education (2013) 
 Department of Pre-School Education (2013) 
 Department of Plilosophy, Education & Archaeology (2013) 
 Department of Philology (2014) 
 Department of History and Archaeology (2014) 
 Department of Economics (2014) 
 Department of Plastic Arts and Arts Sciences (2014)

Research institutes 
Research indicators refer to any work published by the University of Ioannina on all scientific disciplines and to research projects launched through the UoI Special Research Fund.

Ioannina Biomedical Research Institute
The Biomedical Research Institute (BRI) was founded in 1998. It operated as an autonomous institute until 2001, under the name Ioannina Biomedical Research Institute (IBRI).

From September 2001, the institute was merged with the Foundation for Research and Technology-Hellas (FORTH), and its new name is Foundation for Research and Technology-Hellas/Biomedical Research Institute.

BRI has three research directions: Molecular Medicine, Biomedical Technology, and Molecular Epidemiology. In order to fulfill the research aims the institute has established collaborations with the Medical School of the University of Ioannina, as well as with other departments of the university, the University Hospital, and the other institutes of FORTH.

Institute of Transportation & Telecommunications
The University of Ioannina has allied with the regional local authorities and industrial partners to establish an Institute of Transportation & Telecommunication in Igoumenitsa. The institute's expertise in transportation and telecommunication will be concentrated on research, consultancy, and regional development.

University Library and Information Centre
The University of Ioannina has the largest, in terms of effective surface area (14,500 sq. m. divided into six storeys), single library in Greece, which has been named the University of Ioannina Library and Information Centre.

The equipment of the library includes 31 workstations, 504 reading stations, a 120-seat auditorium, an Art Gallery Exhibition Room, a Seminar Room with a seating capacity of 20 people, and 12 carrels.

Users can check availability on the online library catalogue (OPAC) and use photocopying and reservation services. The professionally qualified librarians run training sessions on information handling techniques and assist the users with their inquiries.
 
Other library services include 
 book loans from its own collection or from other libraries in Greece (Interlibrary Loan), 
 reading rooms, 
 access to international information sources via the Internet, 
 access to digitised material of the university, 
 access electronic catalogue databases, 
 access Greek and foreign library catalogues,

Library users include all members of the academic community of the university and the public.

The library covers the fields of: Medicine, Chemistry, Physics, Biological Applications and Technologies, Materials Science and Engineering, Economics, Computer Science, Plastic Arts and Art Sciences, Primary and Pre-School Education, Philosophy, Education, and Psychology.

The Student Collection has multiple copies of books related to the course lectures delivered in all departments.

The library collection has 
 scientific books, textbooks, and journals, 
 newspapers, 
 digital and audiovisual material, 
 encyclopedias, dictionaries, and indexes, 
 books that can be borrowed by students, 
 a collection in Braille, and equipment that can be used by visually impaired people,  
 scientific journals and databases of the Hellenic Academic Libraries Link (HEALLINK), which can be accessed via the Internet,
 digitised documents (journal articles, books, etc.) which are produced by the librarians.

Student life
The university numbers today more than 25,000 students. Among them, there are approximately 21,900 undergraduate students. A number of organised postgraduate study programmes are on offer that combine taught and research elements both at Master's and Doctoral level. Approximately 1,500 students are involved in full-time study mode progressing to a master's degree, while more than 1,700 students are pursuing their studies at Doctoral level.

Catering
The Student Refectory provides meals to all undergraduate and postgraduate students on a full-board (breakfast, lunch, dinner) daily basis.
The refectory is located on campus and covers an area of 4,500 sq. m.

Accommodation
The Halls house almost 650 students on two sites, while a number of rooms have been adapted for disabled students. All accommodation is mixed, with a number of standard rooms (with shared bathroom facilities) or en suite rooms. The majority of rooms are single study-bedrooms although there are some shared rooms (two or three people).

Certain residences are reserved mainly for exchange students (i.e. Erasmus).

Erasmus programme
The University of Ioannina has exchange agreements with universities in mainland Europe through the Erasmus+ programme of the European Commission. The University of Ioannina welcomes foreign students who wish to expand their academic horizons by spending a semester or a year studying in Ioannina.

See also
 List of universities in Greece
 Aristotle University of Thessaloniki
 Balkan Universities Network

References

External links
 University of Ioannina 
 University of Ioannina Internal Quality Assurance Unit   
  University Library & Information Centre
 University of Ioannina DASTA Office (Career Office & Innovation Unit)   
 University of Ioannina - Science and Technology Park 
 University of Ioannina - "Odyssey" Innovation competition 2012-2013   
 University of Ioannina - Science and Technology Park hosted companies   
 Hellenic Quality Assurance and Accreditation Agency (HQAA) 
 Department of Physics, HQAA Final Report, 2010   
 Department of Mathematics, HQAA Final Report, 2011 
 Department of Chemistry, HQAA Final Report, 2011 
 Department of Computer Science and Engineering, HQAA Final Report, 2011 
 Department of Biological Applications and Technologies, HQAA Final Report, 2011 
 Department of Materials Science and Engineering, HQAA Final Report, 2011  
 Department of Medicine, HQAA Final Report, 2013 
 Department of Primary School Education, HQAA Final Report, 2013 
 Department of Pre-School Education, HQAA Final Report, 2013 
 Department of Plilosophy, Education and Archaeology, HQAA Final Report, 2013 
 Department of Philology, HQAA Final Report, 2014 
 Department of History and Archaeology, HQAA Final Report, 2014 
 Department of Economics, HQAA Final Report, 2014 
 Department of Plastic Arts and Arts Sciences, HQAA Final Report, 2014 
 Greek Research & Technology Network (GRNET) 
 okeanos (GRNET's cloud service) 
 synnefo - Open Source Cloud Software (GRNET) 

Universities in Greece
Educational institutions established in 1964
Public universities
Education in Ioannina
Buildings and structures in Ioannina
1964 establishments in Greece